The Iowa Senate is the upper house of the Iowa General Assembly, the legislature of the U.S. state of Iowa. One State Senator is elected from each of the state's 50 electoral districts, with each Senate district containing two House of Representatives districts. The 2021–23 term is part of the 89th General Assembly. , 18 of those seats are held by Democrats and 32 by Republicans. The presiding officer is the President of the Senate, who is chosen by the majority party and elected by the Senate. In addition, senators elect a President pro tempore, chosen in the same manner as the President, and the respective party caucuses elect a majority and minority leader, a majority and minority whip, and assistant party leaders.

Senators serve for four-year terms and are elected in even-numbered years, with half of the Senate elected every two years in the general election on election day, as part of the presidential and midterm elections.  Newly elected senators are sworn in and begin work on the second Monday of January. Should a senator resign from office before his or her term expires, the governor calls a special election to replace the senator. Senators are not term-limited.

Senators generally serve on several standing committees and often serve on joint appropriations subcommittees, permanent statutory committees and various boards and commissions.

Party composition

Leadership

Senators

Notes

See also

List of current members of the Iowa House of Representatives
Iowa Senate

References

General

Specific

External links
Iowa General Assembly

 
Senate
Iowa Senate
Iowa